This is a list of the 2018 RFL Championship season results. The Championship is the second-tier rugby league competition in the United Kingdom. The season is scheduled to begin on February 2.

The regular season will be played over 23 round-robin fixtures, where each of the twelve teams involved in the competition play each other, once at home and once away. Teams will also play one extra match on the Summer Bash Weekend.

The play-offs will commence after the round-robin fixtures. The top four teams in the Championship will qualify for "The Qualifiers", along with the bottom four teams in the Super League. Each team's points totals will be reset to zero and each team will play against each other once. The top three teams will qualify automatically for the Super League in 2019, the fourth and fifth-placed teams will contest the "Million Pound Game" at the venue of the fourth-placed team, with the winner also earning a place in the Super League for 2019, while  the losing team and the bottom three teams will enter the Championship in 2019.

The fifth-twelfth placed teams in the Championship in 2018 will contest the "Championship Shield", where each team will play seven extra games, retaining their original points. The top four teams will contest play-offs, with the first-placed team facing the fourth-placed team and the second-placed team facing the third-placed team; The two winning teams will then contest the Championship Shield Grand Final. The bottom two teams will be relegated to League 1 in 2019.

Regular season

All times are UK local time (UTC or UTC+1) on the relevant dates.

Round 1

Round 2

Round 3

Round 4

Round 5

Round 6

Round 7

Round 8

Round 9

Round 10

Round 11

Round 12

Round 13

Round 14

Round 15

Round 16

Round 17

Round 18

Round 19

Round 20

Round 21

Round 22

Round 23

Notes
 A. Game rescheduled due to poor pitch conditions.

 B. Three games were cancelled in Round 5 due to ice and snow.

 C. Game rescheduled due to poor weather conditions.

 D. Due to renovations, the games have been rescheduled from the initial venue of Lamport Stadium.

 E. Game rescheduled, from the initial venue of Lamport Stadium, in order to commemorate Toulouse Olympique, who narrowly missed out on the qualifiers last season, and Toronto, who became League 1 champions in their inaugural season. The game will be the curtain raiser to the Super League XXIII Magic Weekend.

 F. John McMullen was injured during the 1st half and replaced by touch judge Jamie Butterfield.

References

External links
Official Website

RFL Championship results